The 1994–95 Ukrainian Second League is the fourth season of 3rd level professional football in Ukraine.

Teams

Relegated teams
 Desna Chernihiv - (debut)
 Artania Ochakiv - (debut)

Promoted teams
 Sirius Kryvyi Rih - winner of the Third League (debut)
 Dynamo Saky - runner-up of the Third League (debut)
 Viktor Zaporizhzhia - placed third in the Third League (debut)
 FC Lviv - placed fourth in the Third League (debut)

Renamed teams
 During the season Ros Bila Tserkva changed its name to Transimpeks-Ros Bila Tserkva
 During the season Tavriya Kherson changed its name to Vodnyk Kherson
 During the season Metalurh Kerch changed its name to Okean Kerch
 During the season Garant Donetsk changed its name to Shakhtar-2 Donetsk

Location map

Stadiums 

The following stadiums are considered home grounds for the teams in the competition.

Final standings

Top goalscorers

See also
 1994–95 Ukrainian First League
 1994–95 Ukrainian Premier League
 Ukrainian Third League 1994-95

References

External links
 1994-95 Ukrainian Transitional League (Aleksei Kobyzev, Russian)
 1994-95 Ukrainian Transitional League (Dmitriy Troschiy, Russian)

Ukrainian Second League seasons
3
Ukra